Velika Ševnica is a settlement in the Municipality of Trebnje in eastern Slovenia. It lies north of Trebnje on the road from Račje Selo to Čatež. The area is part of the historical region of Lower Carniola. The municipality is now included in the Southeast Slovenia Statistical Region.

References

External links
Velika Ševnica at Geopedia

Populated places in the Municipality of Trebnje